Fritz August Hoenig (1848–1902) was a German officer and a military writer.

Biography
Hoenig became an officer in the infantry in 1866. He took part in the German Austro-Prussian War (Unification War) and the Franco-Prussian War. He was wounded in the Battle of Mars-la-Tour (16 August 1870) and retired as a captain in 1876.

Bibliography
Hoening works include:
Zwei Brigade (1882)
Oliver Cromwell (3 volumes, 1887–1889)
 24 Stunden Moltkescher Strategie (1891) 
 Gefechtsbilder aus dem Kriege 1870/71 (1891–1894) 
 der Volkskrige an der Loire (6 volumes, 1893–1896)
 Die Entscheidungskämpfe des Mainefeldzuges Fränkischen an der Saale (1895)

Notes

References

1848 births
1902 deaths
19th-century German historians
19th-century German military personnel
Military personnel of Prussia